Igando also known as Igando road is a community located in the Alimosho local government area of Lagos State, South-Western Nigeria? On the 26 July 2016, suspected Niger Delta militants invaded the town, killing several people and destroying properties. Alimosho General Hospital is located there.

References

Populated places in Lagos State